M-152 is a state trunkline highway in the US state of Michigan in Cass and Van Buren counties. The highway runs through the Sister Lakes area providing access to the lake cabins and adjoining farmlands. The highway has existed mostly unchanged since the designation was commissioned in the 1930s.

Route description
M-152 begins at an intersection with South County Line Road on the border between Van Buren and Berrien counties just west of Round Lake.  Known as 92nd Avenue, M-152 travels due east past the Sister Lakes area before turning south on 66th Street. From there, the road passes between Dewey and Magician Lakes before returning to its easterly course where it assumes the name Dewey Lake Street. Between the western terminus and Dewey Lake Street, the highway passes provides access to the cabins around the lakes. The route continues eastward for nearly three and a half miles through farmland before terminating at a junction with M-51. M-152 is not on the National Highway System, a system of regionally important highways. In a traffic survey by the Michigan Department of Transportation (MDOT) in 2009, the department measured the average annual daily traffic (AADT), a computation of the average traffic levels for a segment of roadway on any given day of the year. This was calculated at 3,318 vehicles over the entire length of M-152. The commercial AADT in the same survey was 73 vehicles.

History
M-152 was assumed into the state trunkline system in 1933.  Aside from completing the pavement surfacing of the road in 1945, the route has remain unchanged since its inception. The highway has been considered a potential candidate for transfer to local control. MDOT marked it as a "proposed transfer" in its Control Section Atlas in 1978.

Major intersections

See also

References

External links

M-152 at Michigan Highways

152
Transportation in Van Buren County, Michigan
Transportation in Cass County, Michigan